Like Gangbusters is the first studio album by British new wave band JoBoxers, first released in 1983
and featuring five chart singles.

The first single "Boxerbeat", the group's anthem, worked its way up the UK charts while the group were the opening act on the Madness 'Rise and Fall' tour, reaching number three. It was kept off the top slot by David Bowie's "Let's Dance" and Duran Duran.

Their next single, "Just Got Lucky", became an international hit. This single sold over 250,000 copies, made the UK top 10, and cracked the U.S. top 40, reaching #36 during November 1983,
and has been featured in a number of films including Just My Luck and The 40-Year-Old Virgin.

The third single "Johnny Friendly" is a homage to the Marlon Brando film On The Waterfront. British boxer Frank Bruno appeared in the promotional video for the song.

"Jealous Love"/"She's Got Sex" was released as a double A-side. "Jealous Love" was performed on the UK TV show Loose Talk introduced by the actress Diana Dors in one of her last TV appearances, while "She's Got Sex" was covered on Samantha Fox's double platinum selling album Touch Me (as "He's Got Sex").

Track listing

Personnel
Dig Wayne – vocals
Chris Bostock – bass, vocals
Rob Marche – guitar, vocals
Dave Collard – keyboards, vocals
Sean McLusky – drums, vocals

Additional personnel
John Wallace - saxophone
Nick Pentelow - saxophone

References

External links
 http://www.joboxers.net

1983 debut albums
RCA Records albums
JoBoxers albums
Albums produced by Alan Shacklock